The Little Dead River is an  tributary of the Dead River in Marquette County on the Upper Peninsula of Michigan in the United States. Via the Dead River, its waters flow to Lake Superior.

See also
List of rivers of Michigan

References

Michigan  Streamflow Data from the USGS

Rivers of Michigan
Rivers of Marquette County, Michigan
Tributaries of Lake Superior